This List of University of Oregon faculty and staff includes presidents, staff, and faculty of the University of Oregon.

Presidents of the University of Oregon

The following have served as interim presidents: John Straub (1893), Orlando John Hollis (1944–1945), Victor Pierpont Morris (1953–1954), William C. Jones (1960–1961), Charles Ellicott Johnson (1968–1969), N. Ray Hawk (1969), Robert M. Berdahl (2011–2012), Scott Coltrane (2014–2015), Patrick Phillips (2022-2023), and Jamie Moffitt (2023-present).

Academic faculty

Architecture and allied arts

Business

Education

Humanities and social sciences

Law

Journalism and communication

Music and Dance

Natural sciences

Athletic staff

See also
University of Oregon
List of University of Oregon alumni
Oregon Ducks
Lists of Oregon-related topics

Notes
† Was also an alumnus of the University of Oregon
‡ Notability inherent within the position at the University of Oregon

References

University of Oregon faculty
University of Oregon